Destined to Be is the debut and only studio album by American rapper Herb McGruff. It was released on June 16, 1998 by Uptown Records and Universal Records. Recording sessions took place at The Hit Factory, Greene St. Recording, Battery Studios and Sony Music Studios in New York City, and at Larrabee West in Los Angeles. Production was mostly handled by Heavy D and Ty Fyffe along with Daven "Prestige" Vanderpool and Warryn Campbell among others. It features guest appearances from Big L, Ma$e, Mr. Cheeks and The L.O.X.

The album failed to sell many copies and peaked at only 169 on the Billboard 200, though it did find better success on the R&B and Heatseekers charts. Destined to Be spawned one charting single, "Before We Start" which was a minor hit on the R&B and rap singles charts in the US.

Track listing
"Gruff Express"- 3:37  
"Harlem Kidz Get Biz"- 3:02  
"This Is How We Do"- 2:54 (featuring Mr. Cheeks) 
"Many Know"- 3:29  
"Exquisite/The Spot"- 5:11  
"What Part of the Game"- 4:53 (featuring Cam'ron, I-Born and Panama P.I. 
"Who Holds His Own"- 2:51  
"What'cha Doin' to Me"- 3:57  
"Destined to Be"- 4:02  
"Freestyle"- 1:05  
"Danger Zone"- 4:23 (featuring Big L and Ma$e)
"What You Want"- 4:36  
"Before We Start"- 3:28  
"Reppin' Uptown/The Signing"- 3:46 (featuring The LOX)
"Stop It"- 4:32  
"Before We Start" (Remix)- 3:44

Charts

References

External links

1998 debut albums
Uptown Records albums
Albums produced by Ty Fyffe
Albums produced by Warryn Campbell